Creggan (meaning stony place) is a large housing estate in Derry, Northern Ireland, on a hill not far from the river Foyle.

The estate is very close to the border with County Donegal in the Republic of Ireland.

History

Pre-Troubles
Creggan was originally built specifically to provide housing for the growing population of Derry. There was a Nationalist majority in the city, but the Unionist minority of the then Londonderry Corporation wanted to ensure they kept control of the city. When the Bogside became overcrowded in the 1940s to 1960s, the Corporation agreed to put Nationalist and mainly Catholic families in housing, in the same ward as the Bogside. This ensured continued Unionist control of the Londonderry Corporation. This process is known as gerrymandering.  

As well as the use of gerrymandering by the Corporation, there was also the use of 'restricted franchise' by the Government, where only rate payers had the right to vote. Usually the male head of a family (or matriarch if the male was dead), the person in whose name the rent book was held, was registered to vote. No other adult in the same household could vote. Middle class and upper class people who owned more than one property in the city had the right to vote more than once.

While this political dimension was important, it was the lack of suitable housing for people, mainly Nationalists, which was the most pressing problem, with married couples living with their parents or with family who had housing in the new estates. This type of social injustice gave rise to the civil rights movement in the city in the 1960s.

The Troubles

The civil rights movement that was occurring in Northern Ireland in the late 1960s, took place consistently in Derry. This led to an outbreak of violence between the police, local Unionist Supporters and Nationalists. Violence in the city originally started in the Bogside but quickly spread out to the rest of the city, which included Creggan. One of these occurrences during 12 to 14 August 1969 became known as the Battle of the Bogside. A disagreement over defending Nationalists from British State forces and elements of Unionism led to a split in the IRA, and the two new paramilitary organizations became known as the Official IRA and Provisional IRA.

In the early years, 1969 to 1972, the Officials were the most prominent in Creggan and the rest of Northern Ireland with militant members such as Joe McCann carrying attacks out on the British Army, even though the Provisionals as a whole were carrying out a more violent campaign along with a bombing campaign in Derry City Centre. Following the introduction of internment without trial being carried out by the British government, the Bogside and Creggan effectively became a no-go area for the British government and was only controlled and policed by both wings of the IRA. This all existed until Operation Motorman in July 1972. After this, the no-go area across Northern Ireland became fully controlled by the British government. However, this did not at all stop violence in the city. In 1972 the Officials called a ceasefire, then in 1974 called an end to their armed campaign. This prompted the creation of the Irish National Liberation Army, a radical left wing group formed of hardliner republicans led by Seamus Costello. By 1972, after Motorman, the British Army conducted large scale operations in the once no-go areas. It caused more open clashes between the British Army, the citizens of Creggan and the rest of Derry. This violence continued to occur up to the early 1990s.

Subsequent history
Creggan has experienced a seismic change; long gone are the no-go area and levels of inequality suffered from the 1960s to 1980s. It has seen some redevelopment most noticeably with the redevelopment of the Bishop's Field as a sports and recreation area, the introduction of a play park and the development of a country park and fishery at the old reservoir sites at the edge of the estate.

New housing developments have also been completed on the edge of the estate, the largest of these being the new Ballymagowan area.

Schools in the area have also been significantly redeveloped and much investment has gone into providing a first class education for school children from all across Derry.

On 18 April 2019, 29-year-old journalist Lyra McKee was fatally shot during rioting in Fanad Drive. Police initially suggested the New IRA were responsible for the killing. The New IRA later confirmed responsibility and offered apologies.

Education

Primary
Holy Child Primary School
St John's Primary School

Secondary
St Cecilia's College
St Joseph's Boys' School
St. Mary's Girls School
St. Peter's High School (closed as of 2013)
Lumen Christi College

Places of interest
 City Cemetery – Derry's largest graveyard, opened in 1853. The site includes 194 Commonwealth war graves of those who died in the First and Second World Wars.
 Creggan Country Park – recreation centre
 Bishop's Field – Astro-Turf pitch

Notable people from Creggan
Tony O'Doherty – international footballer, former Derry City F.C. player and manager
Mickey Bradley – bass guitarist with The Undertones
Liam Ball – Irish Olympic swimmer
Dana – pop star, Ireland's first Eurovision song contest winner and politician
Michael Devine – 1981 hunger striker
Don Mullan – author
Charlie Nash – boxer
 Raymond Gilmour – informer Royal Ulster Constabulary (RUC) member (also known as a Supergrass)
 Terry Harkin – international footballer
 James McClean – professional footballer with Wigan Athletic F.C.
 Darren Kelly – ex professional footballer and manager

2001 Census

Two wards in Derry have the name Creggan - Creggan Central and Creggan South. (A 3rd smaller ward in part of lower Creggan is 'Beechwood')

Creggan Central and South are classified by the NI Statistics and Research Agency (NISRA) as being within Derry Urban Area (DUA). On Census day (29 April 2001) there were 3,504 people living in Creggan Central and 2,453 people living in Creggan South.

Of those living in Creggan Central:
34.1% were aged under 16 years and 9.1% were aged 90 and over
46.5% of the population were male and 53.5% were female
98.7% were from a Catholic background and 0.9% were from a Protestant background
12.5% of people aged 16 to 74 were unemployed

Of those living in Creggan South:
30.2% were aged under 16 years and 15.6% were aged 60 and over
45.6% of the population were male and 54.4% were female
98.8% were from a Catholic background and 0.9% were from a Protestant background
10.0% of people aged 16 to 74 were unemployed

Deprivation
According to the Northern Ireland Multiple Deprivation Measure (NIMDM) of 2005, of 582 wards in Northern Ireland, Creggan Central was the 11th most deprived while Creggan South was ranked 15th.

Further reading
Extracts from - 'Creggan: more than a history' by Michael McGuinness and Garbhan Downey (2000). .
'Off Broadway' by Garbhan Downey (Guildhall Press, 2005). A series of humorous short stories set in post-ceasefire Creggan.

References

External links
 Case study - Creggan Enterprises Limited Social Enterprise Coalition. Retrieved 28 December 2006.

Derry (city)